Yves St-Denis is a Canadian politician in Quebec, who was elected to the National Assembly of Quebec in the 2014 election. He represented the electoral district of Argenteuil as a member of the Quebec Liberal Party.

Biography 
From 1986 to 2007, Yves St-Denis has been the owner of a telecommunications firm, in Terrebonne.  Since 2007, he also possesses an amusement center as well as a storage company.  Amid other interests, in 1998, he was elected school commissioner, for the Commission scolaire des Affluents.   In 2007, he was elected President of this same school board until his election as MNA for Argenteuil in 2014.

Provincial political career 

On May 13, 2013, Yves St-Denis was elected councillor for the Argenteuil Liberal Association's executive committee. Provincial riding associations represent the Provincial Liberal Party and participate in the general decision-making by sending delegates to varied conventions and congresses.

On October 6, 2013,  at the liberal nomination convention held at the Lachute Golf Club, Yves St-Denis was elected as the official candidate for the Quebec Liberal Party to represent Argenteuil in the next election .  At that time, Argenteuil was represented by Parti québécois member of the National Assembly, Roland Richer, elected during the partial election of 2012.

At the dissolution of the National Assembly, on March 5, 2014, the Argenteuil Liberal Association offices on Main Street, Lachute, became Yves St-Denis' official campaign headquarters.

On March 30, 2014,  less than 7 days before the election, Yves St-Denis holds a liberal gathering at the Lachute Golf  Club, with Philippe Couillard and Lise Thériault as invited guest speakers. Up to 800 partisans participated.

On April 7, 2014, at the provincial general election,  Yves St-Denis wins the riding of Argenteuil with 38.25% of the vote, thus returning Argenteuil under the Quebec Liberal Party banner.

Yves St-Denis' riding office in Lachute was formerly occupied by David Whissell, and Roland Richer.

References

Quebec Liberal Party MNAs
Living people
People from Laurentides
21st-century Canadian politicians
Year of birth missing (living people)